A dominant language may be:
among the languages known by a multilingual person, the one that they have greater proficiency in
among the languages spoken in an area, the one with the greatest numbers of speakers, prestige or institutional support

See also 
 Linguistic imperialism
 Lingua franca